Dillingham Airport  is a state-owned public-use airport located two nautical miles (4 km) west of the central business district of Dillingham, a city in the Dillingham Census Area of the U.S. state of Alaska. Scheduled passenger service is available at this airport.

As per Federal Aviation Administration records, the airport had 32,215 passenger boardings (enplanements) in calendar year 2008, 29,374 enplanements in 2009, and 42,927 in 2010. It is included in the National Plan of Integrated Airport Systems for 2011–2015, which categorized it as a primary commercial service airport (more than 10,000 enplanements per year).

Facilities and aircraft
Dillingham Airport covers an area of 620 acres (251 ha) at an elevation of 81 feet (25 m) above mean sea level. It has one runway designated 1/19 with an asphalt surface measuring 6,400 by 150 feet (1,951 x 46 m).

For the 12-month period ending April 30, 2018, the airport had 50,892 aircraft operations, an average of 139 per day: 72% air taxi, 26% general aviation, and 3% scheduled commercial. At that time there were 59 aircraft based at this airport: 52 single-engine, 6 multi-engine and 1 helicopter.

Airlines and destinations

Statistics

See also

References

External links
 FAA Alaska airport diagram (GIF)
 
 Topographic map from USGS The National Map

Airports in the Dillingham Census Area, Alaska